In telecommunications, the term channel noise level has the following meanings:

The ratio of the noise in the communication channel at any point in a transmission system to an arbitrary level chosen as a reference.
The noise power spectral density in the frequency range of interest.
The average noise power in the frequency range of interest.

See also 
 Ambient noise level

Notes

References

Noise (electronics)